The Men's Field Hockey Olympic Qualifier was the fourth edition of the Men's Field hockey Olympic Qualification Tournament. It was held at Club de Campo in Madrid, Spain from 2 until 13 March 2004. Twelve nations took part, and they played a round-robin tournament in two groups of six. The top six or seven teams qualified for the 2004 Summer Olympics in Athens, Greece.

Squads

Head Coach: Gilles Bonnet

Head Coach: Gene Muller

Head Coach: Jason Lee

Head Coach: Rajinder Singh

Head Coach: Yoshinori Takahashi

Head Coach: Paul Lissek

Head Coach: Terry Walsh

Head Coach: Kevin Towns

Head Coach: Roelant Oltmans

Head Coach: Jerzy Jóskowiak

Head Coach: Paul Revington

Head Coach: Maurits Hendriks

Results
All times are local, CEST (UTC+2).

Pools

Pool A

Pool B

Ninth to twelfth place classification

Cross-overs

Eleventh and twelfth place

Ninth and tenth place

Fifth to eighth place classification

Cross-overs

Fifth and sixth place

Seventh and eighth place

First to fourth place classification

Semi-finals

Third and fourth place

Final

Statistics

Final standings

 Qualified for the 2004 Summer Olympics

Awards

See also
2004 Women's Field Hockey Olympic Qualifier

External links

Q
Hockey, men's qualifier
 
Field hockey at the Summer Olympics – Men's qualification tournaments
International field hockey competitions hosted by Spain
Field hockey Olympic qualifier Men
Sports competitions in Madrid
2004 in Madrid